Human rights in Tibet is a contentious issue. Even though the United States advocates the human rights of the Tibetan people and even though it once provided funds to the Dalai Lama's independence movement, the United States does not participate in the Tibetan sovereignty debate and as a result, it does not recognize Tibet's right to exist as a country.  Reported abuses of human rights in Tibet include restricted freedom of religion, belief, and association; arbitrary arrest; maltreatment in custody, including torture; and forced abortion and sterilization. The status of religion, mainly as it relates to figures who are both religious and political, such as the exile of the 14th Dalai Lama, is a regular object of criticism. Additionally, freedom of the press in China is absent, with Tibet's media tightly controlled by the Chinese leadership, making it difficult to accurately determine the scope of human rights abuses.

According to a 1992 Amnesty International report (unverified figures), judicial standards in China, including judicial standards in autonomous Tibet, were not up to "international standards". The report charged the Chinese Communist Party (CCP) government with keeping political prisoners and prisoners of conscience; ill-treatment of detainees, including torture, and inaction in the face of ill-treatment; the use of the death penalty; extrajudicial executions; and forced abortion and sterilization and even infanticide. A 2020 Reuters report stated that 15 percent of Tibet's population is part of a mass labor program that human rights groups have deemed coercive. Critics of the CCP say that its official aim to eliminate "the three evils of separatism, terrorism and religious extremism" is used as a pretext for human rights abuses.

Human rights in Tibet prior to its annexation by the People's Republic of China differed considerably from those in the modern era. Before 1951, Tibet was ruled by a theocracy or serfdom and had a caste-like social hierarchy.

Human rights in pre-1950 Tibet

The social system

Judicial mutilation – principally the gouging out of eyes, and the cutting off of hands or feet – was formalized under the Sakya school as part of the 13th century Tibetan legal code, and it was used as a legal punishment until it was declared illegal in 1913 by a proclamation of the 13th Dalai Lama.

To journalist and writer Israel Epstein, a Polish Jew, a naturalized Chinese citizen and a member of the Chinese Communist Party, "the old society" in Tibet "had nothing even remotely resembling human rights." He explains: "High and low, the belief had for centuries been enforced on the Tibetans that everyone's status was predetermined by fate, as a reward for virtues or penalty for faults on one's past incarnations. Hence it was deemed senseless for the rich (even though compassion was abstractly preached) to have qualms about sitting on the necks of the poor, and both criminal and blasphemous for the poor not to patiently bear the yoke. ‘Shangri-La’ the old Tibet was definitely not."

Robert W. Ford, one of the few Westerners to have been appointed by the Government of Tibet at the time of de facto independent Tibet, spent five years in Tibet, from 1945 to 1950, before his arrest by the invading Chinese army. In his book Wind Between the Worlds: Captured in Tibet, he writes

An ancient form of slavery which preceded the development of the feudal system, was still extant in a small number of manors in old Tibet (prior to 1959): the nanggzan manors (nanggzan meaning "family slave" in Tibetan). In these, according to Chinese sociologist Liu Zhong, "exploitation was not through land-rent but through enslavement" to the manor's owner. In return for working the land, the slaves were provided with lodging, clothing and food, albeit minimal. "Some slaves had their families [with them]  while others did not." This residual form of slavery was finally abolished in Central Tibet in 1959 by the Preparatory Committee for the Founding of the Tibet Autonomous Region.

The nature of serfdom and the nature of its applicability to Eastern societies is contested by academics. Tibetologist Melvyn Goldstein wrote in 1971 that "Tibet was characterized by a form of institutionalized inequality that can be called pervasive serfdom". However some academics have questioned the applicability of the concept to Tibet, a recent example was  who argued in 2003 that feudalism and the use of the term 'serf' was misleading in relation to the social system of Tibet and instead she described it as "a caste-like social hierarchy".

In the political debate concerning the legitimacy of Communist Party rule in the Tibetan Autonomous Region, official Chinese sources assert that the Communist invasion was justified in order to end the practice of "feudal serfdom" and other alleged human rights abuses under the Dalai Lama.

The Tibetan Government in Exile and supporters of the free Tibet movement contend that efforts had been underway in the first half of the 20th century to modernise the country, and argue that human rights abuses under the Communist Party have inflicted greater suffering and repression of the Tibetan people.

Crimes and punishments
Trader Gyebo Sherpa was subjected to the severe corca whipping for selling cigarettes. He died from his wounds 2 days later in the Potala prison. Tashi Tsering, a self-described critic of traditional Tibetan society, records being whipped as a 13-year-old for missing a performance as a dancer in the Dalai Lama's dance troupe in 1942, until the skin split and the pain became excruciating.

Yet, incidents of mutilation have been recorded in Tibet in the period between the start of the 20th Century and the Chinese occupation. Tibetan communist Phuntso Wangye recalled his anger at seeing freshly severed human ears hanging from the gate of the county headquarters in Damshung north of Lhasa in 1945. The top level Tibetan official Lungshar's eyes were gouged out by direct order of the Kashag or Tibetan Government was carried out in 1934. An attempt was made at anesthetizing the alleged criminal with intoxicants before performing the punishment, which unfortunately did not work well.

In 1950, the six Tibetan border guards that had been involved in the killing or wounding of Frank Bessac's companions (one of them Douglas Mackiernan) as they were fleeing into Tibet from the Communist advance, were tried and sentenced to mutilation in Lhasa's military court: "The leader was to have his nose and both ears cut off. The man who fired the first shot was to lose both ears. A third man was to lose one ear, and the others were to get 50 lashes each." (The punishment was subsequently changed to lashings on Bessac's request).<ref>These Tibetans killed an American... and get the lash for it. This was the perilous trek to tragedy by Frank Bessac, as told to James Burke, Time-Life correspondent in New Delhi, Life  , November 1950, pp. 130-136: "Just before we left Lhasa, I was told that the six border guards had been tried and sentenced in Lhasa's military court. The leader was to have his nose and both ears cut off. The man who fired the first shot was to lose both ears. A third man was to lose one ear, and the others were to get 50 lashes each. (...) Since the Tibetan Buddhists do not believe in capital punishment, mutilation is the stiffest sentence given in Tibet. But I felt that this punishment was too severe, so I asked if it could be lightened. My request was granted. The new sentences were: 200 lashes each for the leader and the man who fired the first shot, 50 lashes for the third man and 25 each for the other.</ref>

Hostility towards Western missions and churches
In past centuries, Western missionaries made the perilous and time-consuming journey to Tibet, only to be frustrated by the poor number of native converts, to be expelled from the area, or even to be killed or to die. But at different stages of Tibetan history secular rulers and religious leaders such as the Dalai Lama have been eager to protect Western missionaries and their tasks of preaching Christian beliefs to the local Tibetans. The first Western missionary known to have reached Lhasa was the Jesuit Father Antonio de Andrade, accompanied by Fratello Manuel Marques, and their first encounter with the Tibetans was cordial, with the Tibetans greeting Andrade and Marques with friendliness.

However, Christians endured a number of persecutions in old Tibet. In 1630, the Tsaparang Jesuit mission in the Guge Kingdom (presently the Gantok district of West Tibet) fell victim to an uprising by dissident local Yellow Hat lamas, led by the king's brother and abetted by the king of Ladakh, against the King who had lavished favours on the alien mission. Many Christian converts were carried off by force to Ladakh as slaves. The church and properties at Tsaparang and Rudok were sacked, and five resident Jesuits became virtual prisoners of the king of Ladakh who had become the de facto ruler of Guge.
A 1640 effort to reestablish the mission in Guge collapsed when a party of three new priests was attacked as it entered Tibet before reaching Tsaparang and was forced to retreat to India.

Between 1850 and 1880, after the Qing court's decree allowing Western missionaries to purchase lands and construct churches in Chinese provinces, as many as a dozen lower ranking priests of the Paris Foreign Mission Society were killed or injured during their journeys to missionary outposts in the Sino-Tibetan borderlands. In 1881, Father Brieux, then head of the Paris Foreign Mission Society in Batang in eastern Tibet, was reported to have been murdered on his way to Lhasa. After proper investigations, Qing officials discovered that the murder cases were covertly supported and even orchestrated by local lamaseries and native chieftains. Feeling threatened by the increasing number of new Christian converts in eastern Tibet, as well as by the imperial decree allowing the missionaries to openly purchase and possess land, the lamaistic monastic communities and their political patrons felt the need to take drastic measures to secure their religious, financial, and political interests.

In 1904, Qing official Feng Quan sought to curtail the influence of the Gelugpa Sect and ordered the protection of Western missionaries and their churches. Indignation over Feng Quan and the Christian presence escalated to a climax in March 1905, when thousands of the Batang lamas revolted, killing Feng, his entourage, local Manchu and Han Chinese officials, and the local French Catholic priests. The revolt soon spread to other cities in eastern Tibet, such as Chamdo, Litang and Nyarong, and at one point almost spilled over into neighboring Sichuan Province. The missionary stations and churches in these areas were burned and destroyed by the angry Gelugpa monks and local chieftains. Dozens of local Westerners, including at least four priests, were killed or fatally wounded. The scale of the rebellion was so tremendous that only when panicked Qing authorities hurriedly sent 2,000 troops from Sichuan to pacify the mobs did the revolt gradually come to an end. The lamasery authorities and local native chieftains' hostility towards the Western missionaries in Tibet lingered through the last throes of the Manchu dynasty and into the Republican period.Alex McKay (ed), The History of Tibet, London: RoutledgeCurzon (2003), p640-1,643 Christian missionaries banned.

According to Hsiao-ting Lin, it was neither 'anti-imperialism' nor 'patriotism' – contrary to what is asserted by the 'standard' Chinese historical narratives – that led the Tibetans to expel the Western missionaries, but "the fact that Tibetan religious and political figures were desperate to prevent any possible intrusion into their local interests and privileges by Christian authorities."

Reform
According to supporters of the Tibetan Government in Exile, in his reforms the 13th Dalai Lama banned capital punishment, making Tibet one of the first countries to do so.

This is acknowledged by Sir Charles Bell, a friend of the Dalai Lama's, with the reservation, however, that "the punishment for deliberate murder is usually so severe that the convict can hardly survive for long."

Also, historian Alex C. McKay notes that isolated cases of capital punishment did take place in later years, such as the death of one Padma Chandra and the execution of a youth involved in stealing the western Tibetan administrator's horse. McKay also stresses the fact that corporal punishment continued to be inflicted for numerous offences and often proved fatal.

Republic of China's invasion
The Kuomintang's Republic of China government supported Muslim warlord Ma Bufang when he launched seven expeditions into Golog, causing the deaths of thousands of Tibetans.
Author Uradyn Erden Bulag called the events that followed genocidal and David Goodman called them ethnic cleansing. One Tibetan counted the number of times Ma attacked him, remembering the seventh attack which made life impossible. Ma was highly anti-communist, and he and his army wiped out many Tibetans in the northeast and eastern Qinghai, and also destroyed Tibetan Buddhist Temples. Ma also patronized the Panchen Lama, who was exiled from Tibet by the Dalai Lama's government.

Human rights in post-1950 Tibet

Reforms
The 14th Dalai Lama's brother Jigme Norbu reports that, along with these reforms, living conditions in jails were improved, with officials being designated to see that these conditions and rules were maintained."

In the reforms that were enacted after 1959, the Italian Marxist philosopher Domenico Losurdo saw a chance for the Tibetan populace to access the human rights which they were previously denied, besides the chance to gain considerably improved living conditions and a significantly increased average life expectancy. This claim was contrasted by the claim which was made by Choekyi Gyaltsen, the 10th Panchen Lama, who criticized the situation in Tibet by composing a 70,000 character document that dealt with the brutal suppression of the Tibetan people which occurred both during and after the Chinese invasion of Tibet. In this document, he criticized the suppression that the Chinese authorities had conducted in retaliation for the 1959 Tibetan uprising.

Difficulties
According to an Asia Watch Committee report in 1988, the question of human rights in a minority area of the People's Republic of China is inherently difficult to research and address. Official sensitivity around the Tibet issue compounds the problem. Government measures to prevent information about Tibetan protests and protesters from leaving China have hindered human rights monitoring organizations from providing an adequate account of protests and their consequences, according to the CECC.

The position of the Communist Party that any discussion of the issue by foreigners is "unacceptable interference in China's internal affairs" is itself an obstacle to scrutiny. The Chinese government has also linked negative remarks about human rights in Tibet with damage to Sino-American relations. This relates to questions about political prisoners, population transfer, and more, which are "hidden in secrecy," according to the report. Thus, gathering information on such subjects with regard to Tibet is a difficult undertaking.

Types of abuses

Human rights abuses documented in Tibet include the deprivation of life, disappearances, torture, poor prison conditions, arbitrary arrest and detention, denial of fair public trial, denial of freedom of speech and of press and Internet freedoms. They also include political and religious repression, forced abortions, sterilisation, and even infanticide.

The security apparatus has employed torture and degrading treatment in dealing with some detainees and prisoners, according to the U.S. State Department's 2009 report. Tibetans repatriated from Nepal have also reportedly suffered torture, including electric shocks, exposure to cold, and severe beatings, and been forced to perform heavy physical labor. Prisoners have been subjected routinely to "political investigation" sessions and punished if deemed insufficiently loyal to the state.

Physical abuses

According to a UN report regarding the adoption of its Tibetan resolution in 1965, "The Chinese occupation of Tibet has been characterised by acts of murder, rape and arbitrary imprisonment; torture and cruel, inhuman and degraded treatment of Tibetans on a large scale."

According to a secret PLA document purportedly captured by the guerrillas fighting the Chinese army, 87,000 deaths were recorded in Lhasa between March 1959 and September 1960. Regarding this document, Chinese demographer Yan Hao wonders why "it took six years for the PLA document to be captured, and 30 years for it to be published" ("by a Tibetan Buddhist organisation in India in 1990"), adding that it was "highly unlikely that a resistance force could ever exist in Tibet as late as in 1966."

The 10th Panchen Lama said in relation to atrocities by Chinese forces: "If there was a film made on all the atrocities perpetrated in Qinghai Province, it would shock the viewers. In Golok area, many people were killed and their dead bodies rolled down the hill into a big ditch. The soldiers told the family members and relatives of the dead people that they should celebrate since the rebels have been wiped out. They were forced to dance on the dead bodies. Soon after, they were also massacred with machine guns...In Amdo and Kham, people were subjected to unspeakable atrocities. People were shot in groups of ten or twenty... Such actions have left deep wounds in the minds of the people"

Since March 10, 2008, exiled Tibetan sources have documented that 228 Tibetans have died under the crackdown, 1,294 have been injured, 4,657 arbitrarily detained, 371 sentenced and 990 disappeared. Four Tibetans were executed in Lhasa on 20 October 2009, while the Chinese authorities confirmed only two. 11 Tibetans were sentenced to life imprisonment. In the majority of cases the defendants had no independent legal counsel and when a lawyer of choice represented the defendants, the authorities blocked representations either through intimidation or on procedural grounds. Amnesty International have stated that there have been a number of detainees in prisons and detention centres in Tibet have "reported to have died in custody, or within weeks of their release, apparently as a result of ill-treatment or lack of medical care in detention."

In one case a Tibetan from Sichuan province, Paltsal Kyab, died five weeks after he had been detained by police in connection with the 2008 protests. His family was not allowed to visit him while he was detained, and received no news until being informed of his death. When claiming his body, family members found it bruised and covered with blister burns; they discovered later that he also had internal injuries, according to Amnesty International. The police told the family that he had died of an illness, though relatives claimed he was healthy when detained.

In 2017, Jamyang Samten, a Tibetan adolescent of 15 years old that was part of a group of 75 Tibetans fleeing Tibet for Nepal was arrested after a shooting incident in Nangpa La pass. Samten was detained, interrogated and tortured using a cattle prod while being chained to a wall with others detained Tibetans. Samten said that he was also punched in the stomach by a guard with a metal glove. Due to his strong desire in seeing the Dalai Lama Samten afterwards again tried to cross the border to Nepal and succeed and arrived afterwards to India. As of 2007, there were around 3,000 to 4,000 Tibetans annually trying to cross the border to Nepal by paying smugglers.

Allegations of physical genocide
According to Friends of Tibet, an organization that defines itself as a "people's movement for an Independent Tibet", the number of Tibetans killed after the Chinese occupation—a period marked by torture and starvation—now exceeds a million. The 14th Dalai Lama has alleged that 1.2 million Tibetans were killed under Chinese rule.

In her book “People who Count” (1995), Dorothy Stein indicates just how the deaths for which the Chinese are held responsible were arrived at by “Tibetan nationalists” (her words): “they are attributed to ‘figures published by the Information Office of the Central Tibetan Secretariat' in India.” "A letter to Tibetan Review by Jampel Senge (April, 1989, p. 22) says 'The census which resulted in the figure of 1.2 was conducted by the Government in Exile through exiled Tibetans who travelled to meet their relations, and through new arrivals from Tibet."

The figure of 1.2 million dead is challenged by Chinese demographer Yan Hao who says that the methodology used by the TGIE is defective. “How can they come to these exact death figures by analysing documents,” he questions, “if they have problems in working out an exact figure of Tibet's total population alive at present?” “How can they break down the figures by regions” “when they have a problem in clearly defining the boundary of the greater Tibet as well as its provinces?” Yan Hao stresses that “knowledge of statistics tells us that random sampling is necessary for acquiring reliable data in any surveys” and “those conducted entirely among political refugees could produce anything but objective and unbiased results.”

Patrick French, the former director of Free Tibet Campaign in London, states that there is "no evidence" to support the figure of 1.2 million Tibetans killed as a result of Chinese rule. He estimates that as many as half a million Tibetans died from repression and famine under Chinese rule.

In a «Writenet» report prepared for the United Nations High Commissioner for Refugees in 2005, Professor Colin P. Mackerras writes that the claims such as that the Chinese are swamping Tibetans in their own country and that 1.2 million Tibetans have died due to Chinese occupation should be treated with "the deepest scepticism". The figures show that since the early 1960s, the Tibetan population has been increasing, probably for the first time for centuries. What seems to follow from this is that the TGIE's allegations of population reduction due to Chinese rule probably have some validity for the 1950s but are greatly exaggerated. However, since the 1960s, Chinese rule has had the effect of increasing the population of the Tibetans, not decreasing it, largely due to a modernization process that has improved the standard of living and lowered infant, maternity and other mortality rates.

In his essay Hidden Tibet: History of Independence and Occupation published by the Library of Tibetan Works and Archives at Dharamsala, Sergius L. Kuzmin provided detailed analysis of human losses in Tibet, varying from 3 to 30% population when using different sources. He indicated inadequacy of demography-based results and noted that local-level data was generalized and has only been published by the Tibetan emigrants. He concluded that, according to International Law, actions of Maoists in Tibet can be qualified as genocide, regardless of which of the above estimates of population losses one considers to be credible.

Allegations of forced abortions, sterilisations and infanticide
In The Making of Modern Tibet, historian A. Tom Grunfeld observes that "in the years following the [1960] publication of the LIC's report, the Dalai Lama, Purshottam Trikamdas and the ICJ" (International Commission of Jurists) "all claimed to have found proof of sterilization; yet they failed to produce a single person who could be clinically examined to verify these claims."

A demographical survey of Pala – an area located in Western Changtang about 300 miles north-west of Lhasa – conducted by tibetologist Melvyn Goldstein brings to light that from 1959 to 1990 large families remained the norm and that no reproductive restraints were imposed on nomadic herders: "Despite repeated claims in the West that the Chinese had imposed a strict policy of birth control in Tibet, where ‘forced abortions, sterilisations and infanticides are everyday occurrences’ (New York Times, 31 January 1992), there was no policy of restricting reproduction in Pala, let alone evidence of forced abortions, sterilisations or infanticide." An analysis of the fertility histories collected from 71 females aged from 15 to 59 provides strong evidence in support of the conclusion that no population control policy restricting couples to 2 or even 3 births was or is operative. Besides, no Pala nomads have ever been fined for any subsequent children, and all such children and their families enjoy full rights in the community.

In a study of fertility and family planning in rural Tibet published in 2002, Melvyn C. Goldstein, Ben Jiao, Cynthia M. Beall and Phuntsog Tsering claim that there was no evidence in any of the sites surveyed that Lhasa was applying a two-child birth rule in rural Tibet. Although a Tibet Information Network report stated this policy was in place, when Ngamring county, which was cited in the report, was visited, no such policy was evident. The Ngamring county government had striven to increase the use of family planning in the 1990s, but in the summer of 2000 no local nomads or officials in the area of study had heard anything about a two-child limit, nor had any of the officials interviewed at the Ngamring county seat. And finally, no fines had been imposed for fourth and subsequent births. For its authors, "the study highlights the dangers of using refugee reports and anecdotal evidence to interpret highly politicized situations."

In China's Birth Control Policy in the Tibet Autonomous Region - Myths and Realities, Melvyn C. Goldstein and Cynthia M. Beall report that "A series of published reports claim that China was and is compelling Tibetans to adhere to a strict birth control program that includes forced abortions, sterilizations, and even infanticide.

In 1992, Paul Ingram, speaking on behalf of an NGO group for the Convention on the Rights of the Child claimed that "Few people or organisations seem willing to admit that the Chinese FORCE [sic] Tibetan women to be sterilised, or to have abortions, or will entertain the perspective that their policy is one of planned cultural genocide against the Tibetan people, supplemented by an enormous influx of Chinese settlers. Yet there is a great deal of evidence and detailed testimony, which indicates that this has been Chinese policy in Tibet for many years," saying that it was "Nazi-like".

Jezza Neumann, director of Undercover in Tibet (aired on Dispatches), interviewed a Tibetan woman who described her agony at an alleged forced sterilisation operation without anaesthetic.

Infringements on freedom of religion

Tibetans in Tibet state that there are clear limits on their right to practice Buddhism. The most stringently enforced are the ban on public prayers for the 14th Dalai Lama. Also, permission from authorities is required for any large public gathering, Buddhist gatherings not exempted.

The Minister of Foreign Affairs of the People's Republic of China, Yang Jiechi, told a press conference in March 2009 that the Dalai Lama is "by no means a religious figure but a political figure." Xinhua, quoting a Tibetologist, echoed this theme, referring to the Dalai Lama's efforts in establishing a government in exile, establishing a Constitution, and other things. Ending the "Dalai clique"'s use of monasteries for subversion against the state is a core part of the campaign that promotes the CCP's “stability and harmony in the religious field”. The state supervisory organ for Buddhism, the Buddhist Association of China, changed their charter in 2009 to denounce the Dalai Lama for agitating for Tibetan independence. The Central People's Government has asserted a right to approve the next Dalai Lama, according to "historical conventions" used in the Qing Dynasty since 1793.

The Tibetan Centre for Human Rights and Democracy (TCHRD) reported instances of "patriotic education" in 2005, from the testimony of "young Tibetan monks who escaped from Tibet". In them, monks were given political literature and a script to recite to County Religious Bureau officials when they were due to visit. They were instructed to practice denouncing the Dalai Lama as a "separatist" and to pledge allegiance to China, and were quizzed on the literature. Officials also extolled the monks to accept the legitimacy of Gyaincain Norbu, the government choice for 11th Panchen Lama.

According to the CECC, educational, legal, and propaganda channels are used to pressure Tibetan Buddhists to change their religious beliefs into a doctrine that promotes government positions and policy. This has resulted instead in continuing Tibetan demands for freedom of religion and the Dalai Lama's return to Tibet. In June 2009, a monastic official who also holds the vice chairmanship of the CPPCC for Tibet, told monks at Galden Jampaling Monastery in Qamdo that their freedom of religion was a result of the Party's benevolence. The TCHRD has claimed that Chinese authorities in 2003 threatened residents of a Tibetan-inhabited county with expropriation if they did not hand over portraits of the Dalai Lama within a month.

The CCP further increased its influence over the teaching and practice of Tibetan Buddhism in 2009, including intensifying a media campaign to discredit the Dalai Lama as a religious leader and preventing Tibetans from respecting him as such. Chinese official statements also indicated that the government would select a successor to the Dalai Lama when he passes away. Tibetans are expected to "embrace such a development."

'Reshaping' Tibetan Buddhism
In February 2009 The “Tibet Branch” of the Buddhist Association of China changed their charter to pressure Tibetan Buddhist monks and nuns to treat the Dalai Lama as a "de facto criminal" and threat to Tibetan Buddhism, according to a report in China's state-controlled media. The revised charter urged monks and nuns to “see clearly that the 14th Dalai Lama is the ringleader of the separatist political association which seeks ‘Tibet independence,’ a loyal tool of anti-China Western forces, the very root that causes social unrest in Tibet and the biggest obstacle for Tibetan Buddhism to build up its order.” The CECC argues that incorporating language classifying the Dalai Lama as a “separatist” into the charter of a government-designated religious organization increases the risk of punishment for monks and nuns who maintain religious devotion to the Dalai Lama even if they do not engage in overt political activity.

On March 10, 2010, the Dalai Lama stated that "the Chinese authorities are conducting various political campaigns, including patriotic re-education campaign, in many monasteries in Tibet. They are putting the monks and nuns in prison-like conditions, depriving them the opportunity to study and practice in peace. These conditions make the monasteries function more like museums and are intended to deliberately annihilate Buddhism."

The CCP continued to state that Chinese policies in Tibetan areas are a success, and in 2008 and 2009 took a stance of pressuring other governments to abandon support of the Dalai Lama and instead to support the Party line on Tibetan issues.

The Dalai Lama's advocacy on behalf of the Tibetan people and culture is used in official propaganda to argue that he is not a legitimate religious leader, but a political actor. Ending the Dalai Lama's role as supreme religious leader is a core part of the campaign that promotes the CCP's “stability” and “harmony” in the Tibetan areas of China. This was carried out by state-run media and senior government officials. Minister of Foreign Affairs Yang Jiechi, for example, told a press conference in March 2009 that the Dalai Lama is “by no means a religious figure but a political figure.”

The official response to continued criticism of CCP policy from Tibetans includes "aggressive campaigns" of “patriotic education” (“love the country, love religion”) and legal education. Patriotic education sessions require monks and nuns to pass examinations on political texts, affirm that "Tibet is historically a part of China," accept the legitimacy of the Panchen Lama installed by the Chinese government, and denounce the Dalai Lama.

In June 2009, a monastic official who also holds the rank of Vice Chairman of the TAR Chinese People's Political Consultative Conference (CPPCC) spoke to monks at Jampaling (Qiangbalin) Monastery in Changdu (Chamdo) prefecture, TAR, and emphasized the dependency of “freedom of religion” on Party control and patriotism toward China. “Without the Party's regulations,” he told the monks, “there would be no freedom of religion for the masses. To love religion, you must first love your country.”

According to the CECC, Chinese officials justify such campaigns as "legitimate and necessary" by seeking to characterize and conflate a range of Tibetan objections to state policy as threats to China's unity and stability. An example given to substantiate this is comments made by Tibet Autonomous Region (TAR) Party Secretary Zhang Qingli and Vice Minister of Public Security Zhang Xinfeng, speaking during a February 2009 teleconference on “the work of maintaining social stability.” They called for “large numbers of party, government, military, and police personnel in Tibet to immediately go into action” and “resolutely smash the savage attacks by the Dalai clique and firmly win the current people's war against separatism and for stability.” Principal speakers at the teleconference stressed the importance of "education campaigns" in achieving such objectives.

A Tibetan activist group reported that Chinese authorities in Kardze County and Lithang County in Kardze Tibet Autonomous Prefecture ("TAP"), Sichuan Province, as part of the anti-Dalai Lama campaign, threatened the local populace with confiscation of their land if they do not hand over portraits of the Dalai Lama within a month.

Writing in 2005, jurist Barry Sautman asserts that the ban on the public display of photos of the 14th Dalai Lama began in 1996 in the TAR but is not enforced in the Tibetan areas of the provinces of Qinghai, Gansu, Sichuan and Yunnan.

Tibetan-Muslim sectarian violence
The majority of Muslims in Tibet are Hui people. Tension between Tibetans and Muslims stems from events during the Muslim warlord Ma Bufang's rule in Qinghai such as Ngolok rebellions (1917–49) and the Sino-Tibetan War. In the past riots have broken out between Muslims and Tibetans. The repression of Tibetan separatism by the Chinese government is supported by Hui Muslims. In addition, Chinese-speaking Hui have problems with Tibetan Hui (the Tibetan speaking Kache minority of Muslims).

The main Mosque in Lhasa was burned down by Tibetans and Chinese Hui Muslims were violently assaulted by Tibetan rioters in the 2008 Tibetan unrest. Sectarian violence between Tibetan Buddhists and Muslims does not get widespread attention in the media.

Repercussions of the 2008 unrest

In March 2008, what began as routine monastic commemorations of Tibetan Uprising Day descended into riots, beatings, and arson by Tibetans against Han, Hui, and even other Tibetans, killing 18 civilians and 1 police officer. Casualties sustained during the subsequent police crackdown are unknown, according to the U.S. Department of State. Many members of the People's Armed Police (PAP) remained in communities across the Tibetan Plateau during the year, and the fallout from the protests continued to impact on human rights outcomes for Tibetan people.

According to numerous sources, the U.S. Department of State says, many detained after the riots were subject to extrajudicial punishments such as severe beatings and deprivation of food, water, and sleep for long periods. In some cases detainees sustained broken bones and other serious injuries at the hands of PAP and Public Security Bureau (PSB) officers. According to eyewitnesses, the bodies of persons killed during the unrest or subsequent interrogation were disposed of secretly rather than returned to their families. Many monasteries and nunneries remained under virtual lock-down, while the authorities renewed the “Patriotic Education” campaign, according to Amnesty International, involving written denunciations against the Dalai Lama.

Tibetan members of the CCP were also targeted, including being forced to remove their children from Tibet exile community schools where they obtain religious education. In March 2010 as many as 50 Tibetans were arrested for sending reports, photos, and video abroad during the unrest, according to Reporters Without Borders (RSF). One individual received a 10-year prison sentence.

It was Chinese government and Communist Party interference with the norms of Tibetan Buddhism, and "unremitting antagonism toward the Dalai Lama," that were key factors behind the protests, according to a special report by the US Congressional-Executive Commission on China.

Many members of the People's Armed Police (PAP) remained in communities across the Tibetan Plateau during the year, and the fallout from the protests continued to impact on human rights outcomes for Tibetan people. Amnesty International was "deeply concerned at the human rights violations" that occurred during these events and called on the Human Rights Council to address the human rights situation during the 2008 unrest.

Verifiability of exile pronouncements

Psychologist and writer Colin Goldner alleges that although human rights abuses carried out by the People's Liberation Army, especially during the Cultural Revolution, cannot be justified, the pronouncements of Tibetan exiles cannot be trusted, because "These are, if not totally invented out of thin air, as a rule hopelessly exaggerated and/or refer to no longer actual happenings. The contention of the Dalai Lama's exiled government that 'the daily life of the Tibetans in their own land' are dictated by 'torture, mental terror, discrimination and a total disrespect for of human dignity' is pure propaganda meant to collect sympathy points or monetary contributions; such accusations do not reflect today's realities in Tibet. Likewise, the accusations of forced abortions and blanket area sterilizations of Tibetan women, of a flooding of the land by Chinese colonists, of systematic destruction of the Tibetan cultural heritage do not agree with the facts."

Amnesty International have stated that there have been "consistent reports", including "testimonies by former detainees and relatives of detainees who left Tibet illegally" that indicated that people held in police stations and detainees in prisons and detention centres in Tibet have been "systematically tortured and ill-treated." The chairman of the Committee Against Torture stated that "allegations of torture were numerous and mutually corroborative: torture did not seem like an isolated phenomenon." China's report on its implementation of the Convention Against Torture did not address these allegations that torture had occurred in Tibet, with many of the questions the members of the Committee Against Torture had relating to this towards China "remained largely unanswered".

American sinologist Allen Carlson is of the opinion that it is nearly impossible, without substantial field research in Tibet, to verify the numerous allegations of violations advanced by China critics. He does, however, state, "my analysis of Beijing's policies and practices has left me with the impression that the Chinese leadership has no reservations about using whatever means necessary to secure Chinese rule over Tibet."

According to Amnesty International "The Chinese authorities have turned down as “inconvenient” requests for visits to the TAR by several UN human rights experts."

Reported sentencings of Tibetans in Chinese courts

Tibetans are often punished by Chinese authorities for activities that would not be considered crimes under international law, such as exercising their freedom of speech.

See also
1959 Tibetan uprising
1987–1989 Tibetan unrest
2008 Lhasa violence
2010 Tibetan language protest
Antireligious campaigns in China
Censorship in China
History of Tibet (1950–present)
Labour camps in Tibet
Drapchi Prison
Human rights in China
International Campaign for Tibet
International reactions to 2008 Tibetan protests
List of prisons in the Tibet Autonomous Region
Nangpa La shooting incident
Penal system in China
Persecution of Buddhists#Tibet
Protests and uprisings in Tibet since 1950
Racism in China 
Sinicization of Tibet
 Tibetan Centre for Human Rights and Democracy
Tibetan independence movement

 Notes 

References
 Barnett, Robert. What were the conditions regarding human rights in Tibet before democratic reform?, in Authenticating Tibet: Answers to China's 100 Questions, pp. 81–83. (Anne-Marie Blondeau and Katia Buffetrille ed.) (2008) University of California Press.  (cloth);  (paper)
 Grunfeld, A. Tom (1996). The making of modern Tibet, 2nd edition, M. E. Sharpe, 352 pages, chapter Tibet as it used to be (Sections: The social structure - The elite - the people - Education - Nomads - Women and marriage - Health care - Crime and punishment - Religion)
 Stein, Dorothy (1995). People Who Count. Population and Politics, Women and Children, Earthscan Publications, London, XI + 239 p.
 Sautman, Barry. Colonialism, Genocide, and Tibet, Asian Ethnicity, 2006, Volume 7, Number 3.
 Sautman, Barry. "Cultural Genocide" and Tibet, Texas International Law Journal'', 2003, Vol. 38, Issue 2, pp. 173–246.

External links

Sources outside China:
Freedom House 2010 report on Tibet 
Human Rights Watch - China and Tibet
Tibetan Centre For Human Rights And Democracy
Tibet Post International
2008 Uprising in Tibet: Chronology and Analysis
Human Rights - The Central Tibetan Administration
PRC sources
. Information Office of the State Council of the People's Republic of China 1992. (Sections: Part One I. Ownership of Tibet - II. Origins of So-Called 'Tibetan Independence' - III. The Dalai Clique's Separatist Activities and the Central Government's Policy - IV. Feudal Serfdom in Old Tibet - V. The People Gain Personal Freedom - VI. The People Enjoy Political Rights - VII. Economic Development and Improvement of Living Standards - VIII. Freedom of Religious Belief - IX. Development of Education and Culture - People's Health and Demographic Growth - XI. Protection of Living Environment - XII. Special State Aid for Tibet's Development)
New Progress in Human Rights in the Tibet Autonomous Region Information Office of the State Council of the People's Republic of China, 1998

 
Tibetan society
Human rights in China
Torture in China
Tibet
Human rights abuses in China